Albert L. Schwartz (December 21, 1907 – December 7, 1986) was an American competition swimmer who represented the United States at the 1932 Summer Olympics in Los Angeles, California.  Schwartz received a bronze medal for his performance in the men's 100-meter freestyle, finishing third in a time of 58.8 seconds in the event final.  Schwartz was a star swimmer in high school, competing for Marshall High in Chicago, and then starred for Northwestern University.

See also
 List of Northwestern University alumni
 List of Olympic medalists in swimming (men)
 List of select Jewish swimmers

External links
  Albert Schwartz – Athlete profile at International Jewish Sports Hall of Fame
 

1907 births
1986 deaths
American male freestyle swimmers
Jewish American sportspeople
Jewish swimmers
Northwestern Wildcats men's swimmers
Olympic bronze medalists for the United States in swimming
Swimmers from Chicago
Swimmers at the 1932 Summer Olympics
Medalists at the 1932 Summer Olympics
20th-century American Jews